Unsuni is a Pakistani drama serial. It is aired by Pakistan Television Corporation in Urdu language. It is written by Khalil-Ur-Rehman Qamar, directed by Ehraz Ali Mirza.

Plot 
Two persons love each other in the way that they are ready to sacrifice everything for each other. They are walking on separate paths but their souls are always together. They never want to go away from each other. The dialogues of the drama are the main cause of the success of the drama.

Cast 
 Mehwish Hayat
 Sajid Hasan
 Junaid Khan
 ZQ
 Shehryar Zaidi
 Shamim Hilaly
 Bilal Chaudhary
 Maham Amir
 Faris

References

External links 

Pakistani drama television series
Urdu-language television shows
Pakistan Television Corporation original programming